Clithon corona is a species of brackish water and freshwater snail with an operculum, a nerite. It is native to the Western Pacific, from the Philippines to  Micronesia, Papua New Guinea, the Solomon Islands, Vanuatu, New Caledonia, Samoa, Taiwan, and the Okinawa and Ryukyu Islands of Japan.

It is an aquatic gastropod mollusk in the family Neritidae, the nerites.

Description

Ecology
The freshwater crab Clibanarius fonticola uses shells of Clithon corona only.

Human use
It is a part of ornamental pet trade for freshwater aquaria.

References

 Récluz, C., 1841. Description de quelques espèces de nérites vivantes (2 partie, suit et fin),. Revue Zoologique par la Société Cuvierienne: 337-343
 Le Guillou, E.J.F., 1841. Description de quatorze Nérites nouvelles. Revue Zoologique, par la Société Cuvierienne; …: 343-347. Paris.
 Haynes, A. 2005. An evaluation of members of the genera Clithon Montfort, 1810 and Neritina Lamarck 1816 (Gastropoda: Neritidae). Molluscan Research 25(2): 75-84
 Eichhorst T.E. (2016). Neritidae of the world. Volume 1. Harxheim: Conchbooks. 695 pp.

External links 
 Linnaeus, C. (1758). Systema Naturae per regna tria naturae, secundum classes, ordines, genera, species, cum characteribus, differentiis, synonymis, locis. Editio decima, reformata [10th revised edition, vol. 1: 824 pp. Laurentius Salvius: Holmiae]
 Philippi, [R. A. (1845). Diagnosen einiger neuen Conchylien. Archiv für Naturgeschichte. 11: 50-71]
  Martens, E. von. (1863-1879). Die Gattung Neritina. In: Küster, H. C.; Kobelt, W., Weinkauff, H. C., Eds. Systematisches Conchylien-Cabinet von Martini und Chemnitz. Neu herausgegeben und vervollständigt. Zweiten Bandes zehnte Abtheilung. 1-303, pls A, 1-23. Nürnberg: Bauer & Raspe. 
 Lesson, R. P. (1830-1831). Voyage autour du monde, exécuté par ordre du Roi, sur la corvette de Sa Majesté, La Coquille, pendant les années 1822, 1823, 1824 et 1825. Zoologie, 2(1): 1-471
  Martens, E. von. (1863-1879). Die Gattung Neritina. In: Küster, H. C.; Kobelt, W., Weinkauff, H. C., Eds. Systematisches Conchylien-Cabinet von Martini und Chemnitz. Neu herausgegeben und vervollständigt. Zweiten Bandes zehnte Abtheilung. 1-303, pls A, 1-23. Nürnberg: Bauer & Raspe.

Neritidae
Gastropods described in 1758
Taxa named by Carl Linnaeus